State Road 163 (NM 163) is a  state highway in the US state of New Mexico. NM 163's southern terminus is at the end of state maintenance at the former NM 61, and the northern terminus is at NM 52.

Major intersections

See also

References

163
Transportation in Catron County, New Mexico
Transportation in Socorro County, New Mexico